Oliver Hazard Perry La Farge II (December 19, 1901 – August 2, 1963) was an American writer and anthropologist. In 1925 he explored early Olmec sites in Mexico, and later studied additional sites in Central America and the American Southwest. In addition to more than 15 scholarly works, mostly about Native Americans, he wrote several novels, including the Pulitzer Prize-winning, Laughing Boy (1929). La Farge also wrote and published short stories, in such leading magazines as The New Yorker and Esquire.

His more notable works, both fiction and non-fiction, emphasize Native American culture. He was most familiar with the Navajo people, had a speaking knowledge of their language, and was nicknamed by them 'Anast'harzi Nez', i.e. "Tall Cliff-Dweller".

Early life and education
Oliver La Farge was born in New York City but grew up in Newport, Rhode Island.  He was the son of Christopher Grant La Farge, a noted Beaux-Arts architect, and Florence Bayard Lockwood. His older brother Christopher La Farge became a writer and was a novelist. La Farge and his paternal uncle, architect Oliver H. P. La Farge, were both named for a great-great-grandfather, Oliver Hazard Perry.

La Farge received both his Bachelor of Arts degree (1924) and his master's degree (1929) from Harvard University.

Career
La Farge worked as a writer and an anthropologist. In 1925, he traveled with the Danish archeologist Frans Blom, who taught at Tulane University, to what is now known as the Olmec heartland. He (re)discovered San Martin Pajapan Monument 1 and, more importantly, the ruins of La Venta, one of the major Olmec centers.

La Farge devoted considerable study to Native American peoples and issues, especially after relocating to Santa Fe, New Mexico, in 1933. He became a champion for American Indian rights and was president of the Association on American Indian Affairs for several years..

During World War II, La Farge served with the U.S. Air Transport Command, ending service with the rank of major. He participated with the Battle for Greenland, commanded by Colonel Bernt Balchen.  Balchen, together with Corey Ford and La Farge, wrote War Below Zero: The Battle for Greenland (1944) about the actions to defend Greenland.

Marriage and family
La Farge married heiress Wanden Matthews and had two children with her: a son, Oliver Albee La Farge (b. 1931, later known as Peter La Farge and a daughter, Povy.  They relocated to Santa Fe in 1933, but Wanden disliked the area and they eventually divorced in 1937.

Their first son, Oliver Albee, became estranged from his father and changed his name to Peter La Farge. He relocated to New York City, where he became a well-known folksinger and songwriter in Greenwich Village, performing during the 1950s and 1960s. Some of his most successful songs have Native American themes including a famous one, "As Long As The Grass Shall Grow", which takes its name from the title of one of his father's books.

La Farge married a second time, to Consuelo Otile Baca, with whom he had a son, John Pendaries "Pen" La Farge. La Farge's non-fiction book Behind The Mountains (1956) is based on his memories of Consuelo's family, the Baca family of New Mexico who were ranchers in northern New Mexico.  He wrote a regular column for the Santa Fe newspaper, The New Mexican. Some of his columns were collected and published as The Man With the Calabash Pipe (1966).

La Farge died of heart failure in Santa Fe in 1963, at the age of 61.

Legacy and honors
Pulitzer Prize for fiction for Laughing Boy (1929).
Dedicated "Oliver La Farge" branch of the Santa Fe Public Library system.

Works

Non-fiction
 Tribes and Temples (with Frans Blom) 1926-27
 The Year Bearer's People (with Douglas Byers) 1931
 Introduction to American Indian Art (with John Sloan) 1931
 An Alphabet for Writing the Navajo Language, 1940
 As Long As The Grass Can Grow - Indians Today, with photographs by Helen M. Post, 1940
 The Changing Indian (editor) 1942
 War Below Zero: The Battle for Greenland (Colonel Bernt Balchen, with Major Corey Ford), 1944
 Santa Eulalia: The Religion of a Cuchumatan Indian Town (1947)
 The Eagle in the Egg, 1949
 Cochise of Arizona, 1953
 The Mother Ditch, 1954
 A Pictorial History of the American Indian (1956)
 Behind the Mountains (1956)
 Santa Fe: The Autobiography of a Southwestern Town (with Arthur N. Morgan) 1959

Fiction and personal
 Laughing Boy (1929), novel; it was adapted for the 1934 motion picture of the same name.
 Sparks Fly Upward (1931), novel.
Long Pennant (1933), novel.
 All the Young Men (1935), collection of short stories.
 The Enemy Gods (1937), novel.
The Copper Pot (1942), novel.
 Raw Material (1945), a memoir.
 A Pause in the Desert (1957), collection of short stories.
The Door in the Wall (1965), collection of short stories.
 The Man With the Calabash Pipe (collected columns, edited by Winfield Townley Scott), 1966

Translation 

A Man's Place (1940), translation of El lugar de un hombre, by Ramón J. Sender

References

External links

An Inventory of the Oliver La Farge Collection, Harry Ransom Humanities Research Center, University of Texas
Excerpts from Tribes and Temples at Mesoweb.

 

1901 births
1963 deaths
20th-century Mesoamericanists
20th-century American novelists
American columnists
American Mesoamericanists
American short story writers
Harvard University alumni
Mesoamerican anthropologists
Olmec scholars
Writers from Newport, Rhode Island
Perry family
Pulitzer Prize for the Novel winners
Writers from New York City
American male novelists
American male short story writers
Novelists from New York (state)
American male non-fiction writers
20th-century American anthropologists
20th-century American male writers
La Farge family
Burials at Santa Fe National Cemetery
Members of the American Academy of Arts and Letters